Plchovice is a municipality and village in Ústí nad Orlicí District in the Pardubice Region of the Czech Republic. It has about 60 inhabitants.

Administrative parts
The village of Smetana is an administrative part of Plchovice.

Sights
A technical monument is the underground water channel, which runs under the west part of the village. It was built by count František Kinsky in 1853 to bring water to fields near Plchovice. After the completion of the channel, the fields were rented to Plchovice's farmers. The water in the channel comes from the Tichá Orlice river and nearby Jordán brook.

References

Villages in Ústí nad Orlicí District